Knut (Norwegian and Swedish), Knud (Danish), or Knútur (Icelandic) is a Scandinavian and German first name, of which the anglicised form is Canute. In Germany both "Knut" and "Knud" are used. In Spanish and Portuguese Canuto is used which comes from the Latin version Canutus, and in Finland, the name Nuutti is based on the name Knut. The name is derived from the Old Norse Knútr meaning "knot".  

It is the name of several medieval kings of Denmark, two of whom also reigned over England during the first half of the 11th century.

People

Harthaknut I of Denmark (Knut I, Danish: Hardeknud) (b. c. 890), king of Denmark
Knut the Great (Knut II, Danish: Knud den Store or Knud II) (d. 1035), Viking king of England, Denmark and Norway
Subject of the apocryphal King Canute and the waves
Harthaknut (Knut III, Danish: Hardeknud or Knud III) (d. 1042), king of Denmark and England
Saint Knud IV of Denmark (Danish: Knud IV), king of Denmark (r. 1080–1086) and martyr
Knud Lavard (d. 1131), Danish prince and saint
Knud V of Denmark (Danish: Knud V), king of Denmark (r. 1146–1157)
Canute I of Sweden (Swedish: Knut Eriksson) (king 1173–1195)
Canute II of Sweden (Swedish: Knut Långe) (king 1229–1234)
Knud VI of Denmark (Danish: Knud VI), king of Denmark  (r. 1182–1202)
Knut Wallenberg (1853-1938), Swedish Minister of Foreign Affairs and banker
Knut Hamsun (1859–1952), Norwegian author
Knud Rasmussen (1879–1933), Greenlandic polar explorer and anthropologist
Knute Rockne (1888–1931), American football player and coach
Knute Cauldwell (1896-1952), American football player
Knud, Hereditary Prince of Denmark (1900–1976), younger son of King Christian X
Knud Reimers (1906–1987), Danish yacht designer
Knut Schmidt-Nielsen (1915–2007), Norwegian-born American biologist
Knut Haugland (1917–2009), Norwegian resistance fighter and explorer
Knud Heinesen (born 1932), Danish politician
Knut Hergel (1899–1982), a Norwegian actor
Knut Frydenlund (1927–1987), Norwegian Minister of Foreign Affairs
Knut Vollebæk (born 1946), Norwegian Minister of Foreign Affairs
Knut Knudsen (born 1950), Norwegian cyclist, Olympic and World Champion
Knut Fleckenstein (born 1953), German politician
Knut Storberget (born 1964), Norwegian politician and former Minister of Justice
Knut Reinhardt (born 1968), German footballer
Knut Risan (1930–2011), Norwegian actor
Knut Arild Hareide (born 1972), leader of Norway's Christian Democratic Party, and a former Minister of the Environment
Knut Schreiner (born 1974), Norwegian guitarist for Turbonegro, Euroboys, Mirror Lakes, and music producer
Knut Wicksell (1851–1926), Swedish economist
Knut Abraham (born 1966), German politician

Other
 Knut (polar bear) (2006–2011), a polar bear at the Berlin Zoo who attracted worldwide attention
 Adonis Cnut, Rik Mayall's character in the sitcom Believe Nothing
 Knut (band) is a Swiss mathcore band
 The Knut, a unit of currency in the fictitious Harry Potter universe
 KNUT, a radio station in Guam
 Knout, a heavy scourge-like multiple whip

See also
 Knudsen (disambiguation)
 Knutsford
 Knuth
 Kyiv National University of Trade and Economics (KNUTE)
 Nuuttipukki

References

Masculine given names
Norwegian masculine given names
Swedish masculine given names
Danish masculine given names
German masculine given names
ang:Cnut
sr:Knut